Nationality words link to articles with information on the nation's poetry or literature (for instance, Irish or France).

Events

 Alexander Pope begins writing An Essay on Man. The first three epistles will be finished by 1731 and published in early 1733, with the fourth and final epistle published in 1734. Originally published anonymously, Pope acknowledged his authorship in 1735.

Works published

United Kingdom
 James Bramston, The Art of Politicks, published anonymously
 Moses Browne, Piscatory Eclogues
 Henry Carey, Poems on Several Occasions, third edition, extensively enlarged (first edition 1713)
 Thomas Cooke, Tales, Epistles, Odes, Fables, &c., published anonymously
 Soame Jenyns, The Art of Dancing, published anonymously
 Alexander Pope, The Dunciad, Variorum
 William Pulteney, 1st Earl of Bath, The Honest Jury; or, Caleb Triumphant, published anonymously
 James Ralph, Clarinda; or, The Fair Libertine, published anonymously
 Richard Savage, The Wanderer
 Jonathan Swift:
 The Journal of a Dublin Lady, published anonymously
 An Epistle Upon an Epistle From a Certain Doctor to a Certain Great Lord, published anonymously, published this year, although work states "1730", a satire on Patrick Delany, Epistle to His Excellency John Lord Carteret, published this year (although this work also states "1730"); (see also A Libel on D------ D---------- 1730)
 James Thomson, Britannia, published anonymously
 William Wycherley, The Posthumous Works of William Wycherley, Volume 2 (Volume 1 published 1728)

Other
 Petar (Pero) Bošković, Hvale Duhovne, Ragusan published in Venice
 Albrecht von Haller, Die Alpen, Swiss pastoral poem
 Charles de Sainte-Maure, duc de Montausier, editor and co-author, Guirlande de Julie, a manuscript of 41 madrigals first presented to Julie d'Angennes in 1641, first published in full this year, although several of the poems had previously appeared in print; five of the madrigals were written by Sainte-Maure; the other authors were Georges de Scudéry, Germain Habert, Desmarets de Saint-Sorlin, Valentin Conrart, Chapelain, Racan, Tallemant des Réaux, Antoine Godeau, Robert Arnauld d'Andilly and Simon Arnauld de Pomponne; France

Births
Death years link to the corresponding "[year] in poetry" article:
 January 6 – Anne Penny, née Hughes (died 1784), Welsh-born poet
 January 22 – Gotthold Ephraim Lessing (died 1781), German poet
 April 13 – Thomas Percy (died 1811), English clergyman, bishop and poet
 May 23 – Giuseppe Parini (died 1799), Italian satirist and poet
 September 27 – Michael Denis (died 1800) Austrian writer, poet, translator, librarian and zoologist
 November 30
 George Keate (died 1797), English poet and writer
 Samuel Seabury (died 1796), American clergyman and poet
 Also – John Cunningham (died 1773), Irish poet and dramatist

Deaths
Birth years link to the corresponding "[year] in poetry" article:
 January 19 – William Congreve (born 1670), English playwright and poet
 June 29 – Edward Taylor (born c. 1642), Colonial American poet, physician and clergyman
 October 9 – Sir Richard Blackmore (born 1654), English poet and physician
 Date not known – Sìleas na Ceapaich (born c. 1660), Scottish Gaelic poet

See also

 Poetry
 List of years in poetry
 List of years in literature
 18th century in poetry
 18th century in literature
 Augustan poetry
 Scriblerus Club

Notes

 "A Timeline of English Poetry" Web page of the Representative Poetry Online Web site, University of Toronto

18th-century poetry
Poetry